Houston Express is the ninth album led by saxophonist Houston Person.  It was recorded April 8 & 9, 1971 and released on the Prestige label.   To date, it has only been re-released on Compact Disc in South Africa.

Reception

Allmusic awarded the album 4½ stars stating "As period soul-jazz goes, this is considerably above the average. It's funky, but not in the bland crossover sense; there's a sense of jazz ensemble discipline to the arrangements, but it's still R&B-based enough to groove to".

Track listing 
 "Young Gifted and Black" (Nina Simone, Weldon Irvine) - 5:15   
 "The Houston Express" (Horace Ott) - 5:48   
 "Enjoy" (Ott) - 4:55   
 "Give More Power To The People (For God's Sake)" (Eugene Record) - 3:40   
 "Chains of Love" (A. Nugetre) - 7:30   
 "Just My Imagination" (Norman Whitfield, Barrett Strong) - 5:35   
 "Lift Every Voice" (James Weldon Johnson, John Rosamond Johnson) - 5:40

Personnel 
Houston Person - tenor saxophone
Cecil Bridgewater (tracks 4-6), Harold "Money" Johnson (tracks 1-3 & 7), Thad Jones (tracks 1-3 & 7), Ernie Royal (tracks 1-3 & 7) - trumpet
Garnett Brown, Jack Jeffers - trombone (tracks 1-3 & 7)
Harold Vick - tenor saxophone, flute (tracks 1-3 & 7)
Babe Clarke  - baritone saxophone
Paul Griffin - piano, electric piano (tracks 1-3 & 7)
Jimmy Watson - organ
Ernie Hayes - organ, electric piano (tracks 4-6) 
Billy Butler - guitar
Jerry Jemmott - electric bass
Bernard Purdie - drums 
Buddy Caldwell - congas 
Horace Ott - arranger, conductor (tracks 1-3 & 7)

References 

Houston Person albums
1971 albums
Prestige Records albums
Albums recorded at Van Gelder Studio
Albums arranged by Horace Ott
Albums produced by Bob Porter (record producer)